Philip Joseph Cox (28 September 1922 – 14 November 2014) was a Royal Navy officer of the Second World War who was awarded the Distinguished Service Cross for his actions against enemy submarines. He later became a leading Barrister on the Birmingham circuit, becoming a Queen's Counsel and judge.

Cox was the prosecuting counsel in the Donald Nielson "black panther" case of 1975 and the 1978 "Bridgwater four" case, securing convictions in both, though the later conviction was quashed after the police were shown to have falsified evidence.

References 

1922 births
2014 deaths
Royal Navy officers
Royal Navy officers of World War II
Recipients of the Distinguished Service Cross (United Kingdom)
British barristers
Alumni of Queens' College, Cambridge
People educated at Rugby School
20th-century English judges
British King's Counsel
Lawyers from Birmingham, West Midlands